is a Japanese football player for Grulla Morioka.

Club statistics
Updated to 23 February 2016.

References

External links

Profile at Football Lab

1988 births
Living people
Association football people from Gunma Prefecture
Japanese footballers
J2 League players
J3 League players
Japan Football League players
Thespakusatsu Gunma players
Arte Takasaki players
Iwate Grulla Morioka players
Association football defenders